The Aer Lualdi L.55 was a prototype Italian helicopter, a development of the Lualdi-Tassotti ES 53 featuring a far more powerful  Lycoming O-360. While the ES 53 had been purely experimental, the L.55 was Lualdi's first step towards a marketable aircraft.

Specifications (L.55)

References

1950s Italian civil utility aircraft
1950s Italian helicopters
Single-engined piston helicopters